Alberto López may refer to:

Politicians
 Alberto López Rojas (born 1959), Mexican politician
 Alberto López Bello (1985–2013), Mexican journalist

Sportspeople

Football
 Alberto López (Guatemalan footballer) (born 1944), Guatemalan football defender and manager
 Alberto López (footballer, born 1969), Spanish football goalkeeper
 Alberto López (footballer, born 1988), Spanish football winger
 Alberto López (footballer, born 1995), Spanish football left-back

Other sports
 Alberto López Arce (1907-unknown), Cuban chess player
 Alberto López (basketball) (1929–2003), Argentine basketball player
 Alberto López (athlete) (born 1963), Guatemalan sprinter
 Alberto López de Munain (born 1972), Spanish cyclist